Denis Trček (born 1963) is a Slovenian computer scientist and university professor.

Trček graduated in 1988 at the Faculty of Electrical Engineering at the University of Ljubljana where he received in 1995 also his Ph.D. degree in communication security.

Career

Faculty professor
After graduation, he took a position first at the Iskra company and then at the Jožef Stefan Institute in Ljubljana.
In 2007 he joined the Faculty of Computer and Information Science at the University of Ljubljana where he holds since 2012 a position of a full professor.
He is the head of the Laboratory of e-media  and of the national research programme Pervasive computing.

Scientist
In 2002 Trček was a visiting scientist at the Ludwig Maximilian University of Munich and in 2015  at Stanford University in United States as a Fulbright scholar. 
Trček was or is a member of several national and international technical committees, such as for example the European Network and Information Security Agency (ENISA) and the IFIP working group 11.2 (Pervasive Systems Security).
As a visiting lecturer, he took part in many scientific meetings in Europe and USA and gave invited lectures at several universities all over the world.

Trček was professionally involved first in introducing Internet to former Yugoslavia. 
Later, he started to research security and privacy in computer networks and information systems.
On this topic, he published more than a hundred scientific articles and a book with Springer.

Selected bibliography 
Trcek, D. (2006). Managing information systems security and privacy. Springer Science & Business Media.
 Trcek, D. (2011). "Trust management in the pervasive computing era". IEEE Security & Privacy, 9(4), 52-55.
 Trček, D. (2013). "Lightweight protocols and privacy for all-in-silicon objects". Ad hoc networks, 11(5), 1619-1628.
 Trcek, D., & Brodnik, A. (2013). "Hard and soft security provisioning for computationally weak pervasive computing systems in e-health". IEEE wireless communications, 20(4), 22-29.
 Trček, D. (2014). "Qualitative Assessment Dynamics—Complementing Trust Methods For Decision Making". International journal of information technology & decision making, 13(01), 155-173.

References

See also 
 Repository of the University of Ljubljana
 Researchgate.net
 List of University of Ljubljana people
 List of Slovenes

1963 births
Living people
Slovenian computer scientists
Engineers from Ljubljana
University of Ljubljana alumni
Academic staff of the University of Ljubljana